Chameh or Chemeh or Chammeh may refer to:
 Chameh, Kermanshah
 Chammeh, Zanjan
 Chamoe, also known as the Korean melon
 Chamaa, village in Lebanon